Napoleon High School may refer to high schools in the following locations:

Napoleon High School (Michigan), Napoleon, Michigan
 Napoleon High School (Napoleon, North Dakota), Napoleon, North Dakota
Napoleon High School (Ohio), Napoleon, Ohio